Ellinore Lightbody (born 16 February 1959) is a British tennis coach and former professional player.

Scottish-born, Lightbody is the daughter of Wales tennis executive Jim Lightbody and grew up in Swansea.

Lightbody featured in the singles main draw of the 1982 Wimbledon Championships and later coached in Hong Kong, where she made Federation Cup appearances for the British territory in 1990 and 1991.

As a coach in the United Kingdom she has previously served as the national coaches of both Wales and Scotland.

References

External links
 
 
 

1959 births
Living people
Hong Kong female tennis players
Welsh female tennis players
British female tennis players
British tennis coaches
Sportspeople from Swansea